Darfield  may refer to:

Darfield, British Columbia, a town in British Columbia just to the north of Kamloops
Darfield, New Zealand, a town in the South Island
Darfield, South Yorkshire, a village in the borough of Barnsley, South Yorkshire, England